Deep Lake is a  lake in Siskiyou County, California.

See also
 List of lakes in California

References

Lakes of Siskiyou County, California
Lakes of California
Lakes of Northern California